Miltoniopsis, abbreviated Mltnps. in horticultural trade, is a genus of orchids native to Costa Rica, Panama, Venezuela, Colombia, Ecuador, and Peru. This genus comprises 5 species. Miltoniopsis's common name is Pansy Orchid.

Although the flowers are similar, Miltoniopsis differs from Miltonia by having one leaf to each pseudobulb, and a lobed column that is united to the labellum through a keel. In addition, the column is not concave at the base.

Species

References

Further reading
  (1889) L'Orchidophile 9: 63.
  (2009). Epidendroideae (Part two). Genera Orchidacearum 5: 300 ff. Oxford University Press.

External links
 
 
 Article on the Oncidium Alliance Orchids

 
Orchids of Central America
Orchids of South America
Oncidiinae genera